"Edge of Heaven" is a song recorded by Belgian/Dutch Eurodance band 2 Unlimited. It was released in June 1998 as the second single to feature Romy van Ooijen and Marjon van Iwaarden as the lead vocalists. It is taken from 2 Unlimited's fourth studio album, II. The release scored chart success notably peaking at #7 in Belgium, #8 in Spain and #34 on the Eurochart Hot 100.

The single was due to be released in the UK in August 1998, but its release was cancelled.

Music video
The music video for "Edge of Heaven" was directed by Mike Bell.

Track listing

Charts

References

1998 singles
2 Unlimited songs
1998 songs
Songs written by Jean-Paul De Coster
Songs written by Phil Wilde
Byte Records singles